Calcium stearoyl-2-lactylate (calcium stearoyl lactylate or CSL) or E482 is a versatile,  FDA approved food additive.  It is one type of a commercially available lactylate.  CSL is  non-toxic,  biodegradable, and typically manufactured using  biorenewable  feedstocks.  Because CSL is a safe and highly effective food additive, it is used in a wide variety of products from  baked goods and  desserts to packaging.

As described by the  Food Chemicals Codex 7th edition, CSL is a cream-colored powder.  CSL is currently manufactured by the esterification of stearic acid and lactic acid with partial neutralization using food-grade hydrated lime (calcium hydroxide).  Commercial grade CSL is a mixture of calcium salts of stearoyl lactic acid, with minor proportions of other salts of related acids.  The  HLB for CSL is 5.1.  It is slightly soluble in hot water.  The pH of a 2% aqueous suspension is approximately 4.7.

Food labeling requirements
To be labeled as CSL for sale within the United States, the product must conform to the specifications detailed in 21 CFR 172.844.  In the EU, the product must conform to the specifications detailed in Regulation (EC) No 96/77.  Tests for these specifications can be found in the Food Chemical Codex.  Acceptance criteria for these two regions are as follows:

To be labeled as CSL for sale in other regions, the product must conform to the specifications detailed in that region's codex.

Food applications and maximum use levels
CSL finds widespread application in  baked goods,  cereals, pastas, instant rice,  desserts,  icings,  fillings,  puddings,  toppings,  sugar confectionaries, powdered  beverage mixes,  creamers,  cream liqueurs,  dehydrated potatoes,  snack dips,  sauces,  gravies, chewing gum,  dietetic foods, minced and diced  canned meats, and  mostarda di frutta.  In the United States, approved uses and use levels are described in 21 CFR 172.844, 21 CFR 176.170 and 21 CFR 177.120. while the corresponding regulations in the EU are listed in Regulation (EC) No 95/2.

The largest application of CSL is in yeast leavened bakery products.  Although CSL was introduced to the market first, most applications use SSL.  The main reason for the preference of SSL over CSL is that CSL has less crumb softening effects than SSL.  However, CSL is still preferred in some applications, such as lean hearth bread-type formulations.  In these applications, CSL is preferred because CSL performs better than SSL as a dough strengthener, while the finished product does not require a soft crumb or a perfectly symmetrical loaf shape.

References

Food additives
Salts of carboxylic acids
Calcium compounds
E-number additives